Dali Ruilong F.C. (Simplified Chinese: 大理锐龙足球俱乐部) was a football club based in Dali, Yunnan.

History
The club was originally established as a nondescript amateur side called Kunming Ruilong Football Club that had competed in the amateur competitions within the city of Kunming, and won the city league title in 2010. On 20 March 2012, they're rebranded as a professional club, and registered to play within China League Two, the third tier of the Chinese football league system in the 2012 league season. In Kunming Ruilong's first League Two season, they finished 3rd place in the South Group and advanced into the Play-offs. However, they were knocked out by Qinghai Senke 3–2 on aggregate in the quarter-finals. The club moved their home stadium to Dali, another city in Yunnan, and changed their name to Dali Ruilong Football Club on 22 March 2013. After the 2013 China League Two season, they merged into Lijiang Jiayunhao and ceased their existence.

All-time league rankings

 in South Group

References

Defunct football clubs in China
Football clubs in China
Sport in Yunnan